The Takht Jamshid Cup's 1973–74 football season was the first season of Iranian national football league and the first season after the establishment of the Takht Jamshid Cup. Persepolis F.C. were champions.

Standings

Top goalscorers

References 
Pars sport

Takht Jamshid Cup
Iran
1973–74 in Iranian football